Joseph Wright (28 June 1908 – 1967) was an English professional rugby league footballer who played in the 1930s.

International honours
Joe Wright won caps for England while at Swinton in 1932 against Wales, in 1933 against Other Nationalities, and in 1934 against France, and won a cap for Great Britain while at Swinton in 1932 against New Zealand.

References

External links

1908 births
1967 deaths
England national rugby league team players
English rugby league players
Great Britain national rugby league team players
Place of birth missing
Place of death missing
Rugby league players from Carlisle
Rugby league props
Rugby league second-rows
Swinton Lions players